Barry Teague (born 19 March 1946) is a former Australian rules footballer who played for the Richmond Football Club in the Victorian Football League (VFL).

Notes

External links 
		

Living people
1946 births
Australian rules footballers from Victoria (Australia)
Richmond Football Club players
Moorabbin Football Club players